William Browne (6 November 1898 – 25 October 1980) was an Australian cricketer. He played in one first-class match for Queensland in 1921/22.

See also
 List of Queensland first-class cricketers

References

External links
 

1898 births
1980 deaths
Australian cricketers
Queensland cricketers
Cricketers from Toowoomba